ASIST can refer to:
 Aircraft Ship Integrated Secure and Traverse
 Association for Information Science and Technology